Dendrobium subbilobatum is a species of orchid found in New Guinea.

References

subbilobatum
Orchids of New Guinea
Endemic flora of New Guinea